Widen Enterprises Inc. is an American privately held technology company that designs, develops and provides digital asset management and product information management software as well as digital asset management services. The company was founded in 1948 in Madison, Wisconsin by Arthur and Emily Widen, initially as Widen Engraving Co., a plate-engraving business providing printing-plates for newspapers. The company has sustained business viability and longevity by adapting its products to technological advances and business model transformation, the company now has headquarters in both Madison, Wisconsin and London, United Kingdom.

History

1948 – Widen Engraving Co. – Founding and incorporation

In 1948, Arthur Widen and Emily Widen, spurred on by his experience working in the Madison newspaper industry and backed by her financial support in the form of a $1,500 mortgage, founded Widen Engraving Co. The business initially helped newspapers create newsprint by engraving creative and marketing materials from photographs and type onto zinc and copper plates.

1960 - 1990 – Widen Colorgraphics Ltd. – Prepress era

In 1960, Widen altered their business model by moving beyond the engraving process and began to undertake further prepress activities. The company converted marketing content in the form of photos, illustrations, logos and copy into printed catalogues and advertisements and commenced working with film negatives. A change in its name reflected this transformation, and the company became Widen Colorgraphics Ltd. In 1985, led by Mark Widen, son of founders Arthur and Emily Widen, the company began to focus on colour scanning and printing services.

1990 - Present day – Widen Enterprises Inc. – Digital asset management

With the advancement of prepress technologies and processes, under Reed Widen, son of Mark Widen, the company embraced digital technology, initially through digital printing and created an internal research and development department to innovate and keep abreast of technological developments in the industry. In 1996, Widen's R&D department developed the company's first image database, which would become Widen's first digital asset management software. The software was made available to clients as a product in 1998. In 1997 the company changed its name from Widen Colorgraphics to Widen Enterprises Inc.

Matthew Gonnering was appointed as CEO in 2009 and steered the company further towards the software as a service (SaaS) model. Widen Enterprises has since developed its software into a cloud based digital management hub that allows users to readily access and manage their digital assets and product information data. Alongside the software, the company has focused its efforts on customer experience by offering services to aid in the production and implementation of digital assets, as well as training and consultancy on the digital asset management process.

In september 2021, Widen Enterprises was acquired by Acquia, a software-as-a-service company co-founded by Dries Buytaert and Jay Batson to provide enterprise products, services, and technical support for the open-source web content management platform Drupal.

Investing in new technologies

Widen's move away from engraving in the 1960s, was marked by the company's investment in film negatives and photography, such as in the purchase of the first available automated separation camera to embrace the advent of color in the printing industry. In 1985, the company invested $3 million in colour scanners and Scitex equipment, and became the largest Scitex installation in North America.

Awards and recognition

Product awards

In September 2020, Widen's software was named “Best Digital Asset Management Platform” in the MarTech Breakthrough Awards 2020. The software was particularly noted for its new Product Information Management capabilities. Widen was named a “Strong Performer” in The Forrester Wave™: Digital Asset Management For Customer Experience, Q4 2019.

In 2019, Widen won “Best Digital Asset Management Platform” for its digital asset management software at the Marketing Technology Awards hosted by ClickZ and Search Engine Watch, where the judging panel was made up of customers and experts within the industry.

In 2018 Widen's software was heralded as a “strong performer” for customer experience by independent technology research firm Forrester, due to its intuitive user interface and based on favorable feedback from customers.
 
Widen was named the digital asset management vendor of the year by the Codified DAM Consultant in 2017, an independent software analysis and comparison firm. In order to win this accolade, the software was assessed on the firm's “Ten Core Characteristics of a Digital Asset Management System”. Widen was also commended for a high standard of customer support.

Also in 2017, Widen won the award for the “Best Digital Asset Management Solution” from SIIA, an independent trade association.

Company and staff awards

Widen was named “Company of the Year” in 2019 by SIIA largely due to a growth in revenue and a strong company culture. In 2018, WorldBlu, a business training organization, recognized Widen for a commitment to operating with purpose and vision and helping its employees to do the same, primarily because of their focus on employee wellness.

Widen was also named in Comparably's 2017 nationwide list of best places to work, ranking 42nd for best company culture, 25th for best managers and fourth for best CEO. Also in 2017, the company was recognized in the list of the "100 companies that matter the most in the digital content industry" by the industry publication EContent.

References

1948 establishments in Wisconsin
Software companies based in Wisconsin
Cloud computing providers
Printing companies of the United States
Defunct software companies of the United States